The Haval M6 is a compact CUV produced by the Chinese manufacturer Great Wall Motor under the Haval sub-brand from 2017. The M6 shares the same platform and serves as a sporty variant of the first generation Haval H6, and a second generation model called the Haval M6 Plus was launched in 2021 while still riding on the same platform shared with the first generation Haval H6.

First generation

The M6 shares the same platform and serves as a sporty variant of the first generation Haval H6. Pricing starts from 89,800 yuan to 112,800 yuan.  
The engine of the Haval M6 is the same as the first generation Haval H6 that it was based on which is a 1.5 liter turbo engine producing 150hp.

2019 facelift
A facelift for the 2019 model year Haval M6 was launched in June 2019 featuring a redesigned front end. The updated model wears the updated black Haval logo and fulfills the National V and VI emissions standard. The powertrain remains to be the same 1.5 liter turbo engine producing 150hp and 210N·m, with an addition of a 7-speed wet dual-clutch transmission added to the transmission options. The fuel economy is 6.8L/100km according to Haval officials.

Second generation (M6 Plus)

The second generation Haval M6 was sold as the Haval M6 Plus in China from January 2021. The M6 Plus model received a complete makeover compared to the first generation model despite it still riding on the same platform as the first generation model. The interior of the M6 Plus is completely redesigned. The M6 Plus is powered by a 1.5-litre turbo engine codenamed GW4G15F producing a maximum output of 150hp and 210N·m. Transmission options include a 6-speed manual transmission and a 6-speed dual-clutch transmission.

References

External links

Official website

M6
Compact sport utility vehicles
Front-wheel-drive vehicles
All-wheel-drive vehicles
Cars introduced in 2017
Cars of China